Abdulaziz Al Sharid (born 5 January 1994) is a Saudi Arabian professional footballer who plays as a midfielder for Al-Faisaly.

Honours
Al-Hilal
Crown Prince Cup: 2015–16

Al-Batin
MS League: 2019–20

Al-Faisaly
King Cup: 2020–21

External links

References

1994 births
Living people
Saudi Arabian footballers
Association football midfielders
Al Hilal SFC players
Al-Taawoun FC players
Ohod Club players
Al-Fateh SC players
Al-Ain FC (Saudi Arabia) players
Al Batin FC players
Al-Faisaly FC players
Place of birth missing (living people)
Saudi Professional League players
Saudi First Division League players